{{DISPLAYTITLE:C16H19N3}}
The molecular formula C16H19N3 (molar mass: 253.342 g/mol, exact mass: 253.1579 u) may refer to:

 Aptazapine (CGS-7525A)
 Solvent Yellow 56

Molecular formulas